1 Mai is a metro station in northern Bucharest, serving line M4. It is situated in Chibrit or Clăbucet Square, at the intersection of Calea Griviței, Ion Mihalache Boulevard, and Bucureștii Noi Road.

The station was opened on 1 March 2000, as part of Stage I of the M4 line, from Gara de Nord to 1 Mai. On 1 July 2011, the line was extended to Parc Bazilescu.

Architecture
The station was built in a manner similar to Griviţa Metro, and Gara de Nord II.

It has a wide central platform, a blue-grey and dark color scheme using black granite floors, blue and grey synthetic walls, and chrome and aluminum metal insertions.

Name
The name of the station was chosen based on the former name of Ion Mihalache Boulevard – 1 Mai Boulevard.

Incidentally, that avenue may also host a metro station in the future.

References

Bucharest Metro stations
Railway stations opened in 2000
2000 establishments in Romania